Mohammad Yusef Khan, and other spellings, is the name of:

Muhammad Yousuf Khan (born 1922), also known as Dilip Kumar, is an Indian film actor
Mohammad Yusuf Khan, father of Mohammed Nadir Shah
Mohammad Yusuf (politician) (aka, Mohammad Yusuf Khan, 1917–98), prime minister and foreign minister of Afghanistan

See also
 Muhammad (disambiguation)
 Muhammad (name)
 Khan (disambiguation)